Karel Kesselaers (born 3 September 1959) is a Belgian former soccer player. In 1983, he was selected as player of the season by KV Mechelen in the same year of their promotion to the Belgian League. In 1987, he won the Belgian Cup, also with KV Mechelen, and in 1988 he won the European Cup Winners Cup with the team.

External links
Profile at Voetbal International

K.S.K. Beveren players
Living people
1959 births
Association football defenders
Belgian footballers
K.V. Mechelen players
Francs Borains players